The Costa Rica national handball team is the national handball team of Costa Rica and is controlled by the Federacion Costaricense de Balonmano and takes part in international handball competitions. It is affiliated to the IHF and the PATHF.

Tournament record

Pan American Championship

South and Central American Championship

Central American and Caribbean Games

Central American Games

Central American Championship

IHF South and Central American Emerging Nations Championship

Current squad
This is the squad for the 2014 Central American and Caribbean Games.

Head coach: Solón Jarquín Jarquín
Goalkeeping coach: Jorge Ocampo Arce

References

External links

IHF profile

Handball in Costa Rica
Men's national handball teams